Ira Greenlief Hersey (March 31, 1858 – May 6, 1943) was a politician from Hodgdon, Maine, who served in the Maine House of Representatives, the Maine State Senate, and most notably in the United States Congress as a Representative for the U.S. State of Maine.

Biography
Hersey was born on March 31, 1858, in Hodgdon, Maine. He attended the public schools and Ricker Classical Institute.  He studied law, was admitted to the bar in 1880 and commenced practice in Houlton.

He was an unsuccessful candidate for Governor of Maine in 1886.  He was elected a member of the Maine House of Representatives from 1909 to 1912.  He served in the Maine Senate from 1913 to 1916 and was president of that body in 1915 and 1916. He was elected as a Republican to the Sixty-fifth and to the five succeeding Congresses, serving from March 4, 1917, to March 3, 1929.  He was chairman of the U.S. House Committee on Expenditures on Public Buildings in the Sixty-sixth Congress, and was one of the managers appointed by the House of Representatives in 1926 to conduct the impeachment proceedings against George W. English, judge of the United States District Court for the Eastern District of Illinois.  He was an unsuccessful candidate for renomination in 1928 to the Seventy-first Congress.

He became judge of probate for Aroostook County, Maine, serving from 1934 until 1942, when he retired and moved to Washington, D.C.  He died on May 6, 1943, in Washington and he was buried in Evergreen Cemetery in Houlton, Maine.

Congressional career
Hersey supported the Immigration Act of 1924, saying during a speech in the House of Representatives the United States was "a mighty land settled by Northern Europeans from the United Kingdom, the Norsemen, and the Saxon."

References

1858 births
1943 deaths
Republican Party members of the Maine House of Representatives
Presidents of the Maine Senate
Republican Party Maine state senators
Methodists from Maine
People from Hodgdon, Maine
Ricker College alumni
Republican Party members of the United States House of Representatives from Maine
People from Houlton, Maine